The Baotou–Lanzhou railway, also known as the Baolan line is a  railway line that connects the cities of Baotou in Inner Mongolia to Lanzhou in Gansu Province.

Cities 
The railway passes through the following cities:
 Inner Mongolia: Baotou, Bayan Nur, Wuhai
 Ningxia: Shizuishan, Yinchuan, Wuzhong, Zhongwei
 Gansu: Baiyin, Lanzhou

Intersecting railways 
The Baotou–Lanzou railway connects with eight other railways, most of them connecting in the city of Baotou.  In Baotou, the Beijing–Baotou railway extends the line from the Baotou West railway station to Beijing.  The Baotou–Shenmu railway leaves Baotou railway station and heads south towards Shenmu county in Shaanxi Province.  After passing the Baotou West railway station, the Baotou Ring railway circles around the city and has stops at various stations in Baotou.

At Linhe District in Bayan Nur Municipality, the Linhe–Ceke railway, branches westward off Baotou–Lanzhou railway to Ceke in Alxa League.

In the Ningxia Autonomous Region, the line connects with three other railways.  It connects to Pingluo–Rujigou railway near the Huinong District. The Baoji–Zhongwei railway and the Taiyuan–Zhongwei railway join the Baotou–Lanzhou railway at Zhongwei.  Also at Gantang the line splits to form the Gantang–Wuwei railway

The railway finally connects with three other railways in Gansu Province.  At the Bayin West railway station, the line meets with the Honghui railway, which connects it with Honghui.  In Lanzhou, the railway intersects with the Longhai railway, both of which have their termini at Lanzhou.  Then at the Lanzhou railway station, the line continues west as the Lanzhou–Xinjiang railway, to the Xinjiang Autonomous Region.

See also 

 Rail transport in China
Rail transport in Inner Mongolia
 List of railways in China

Railway lines in China
Rail transport in Inner Mongolia
Rail transport in Ningxia
Rail transport in Gansu